Wesley Moodie (born 14 February 1979) is a former professional tennis player from South Africa.

Career

Early life and college career
He began to play tennis at an early age and won the South African Junior Masters tournament in February 1996.

Moodie played college tennis in the United States from January 1997 until May 2000, originally for Auburn University at Montgomery (AUM), and then from September 1998 at Boise State (BSU). He turned professional in June 2000.

Professional career
Moodie first came to public notice when he reached the third round at Wimbledon in 2003, losing to Sébastien Grosjean, whom he beat in the United States later that year. Moodie won his first top-flight tour singles event in capturing the 2005 Japan Open, beating fifth seed Mario Ančić in the final 1–6, 7–6, 6–4, after saving two match points in the tie-break (he had also saved four match points in the semifinal against Jarkko Nieminen).

Along with Stephen Huss, who formerly played college tennis for the Auburn Tigers, he became the first qualifier to win the Wimbledon men's doubles championship in 2005, beating the No. 6, 9, 3, 1 & 2 seeds in the process.

Wesley Moodie joined the Monte Carlo Tennis Academy on 9 June 2007.

Playing style
Moodie is a serve-and-volley specialist who has developed his baseline game to a high level of proficiency. His 6 ft 5 in height is combined with a powerful serve.

Personal
Moodie is married to wife Marcia, a teacher. They have a daughter, Danica Jade, born 30 November 2006.

Grand Slam finals

Doubles: 2 (1 title, 1 runner-up)

Mixed doubles: 1 (1 runner-up)

ATP career finals

Singles: 1 (1 title)

Doubles: 13 (6 titles, 7 runner-ups)

Career statistics

Doubles performance timeline

References

External links

 
 
 
 Moodie world ranking history
 Profile page of Wesley Moodie at the Monte Carlo Tennis Academy website
 Wesley Moodie Foundation Website

1979 births
Living people
Auburn University at Montgomery alumni
Boise State University alumni
Sportspeople from Durban
South African expatriate sportspeople in the United Kingdom
South African male tennis players
South African people of English descent
Grand Slam (tennis) champions in men's doubles
White South African people
Wimbledon champions
South African expatriate sportspeople in the United States